is a tiny near-Earth asteroid that passed  above Earth's surface on 13 November 2020 at 17:20 UTC. The asteroid was discovered by the Asteroid Terrestrial-impact Last Alert System (ATLAS) survey at the Mauna Loa Observatory fifteen hours after its closest approach to Earth. The Earth encounter perturbed the asteroid's trajectory from an Earth-crossing Apollo-type orbit to an Aten-type orbit, subsequently reducing the asteroid's heliocentric orbital period from 1.5 years to 0.86 years.

 passed closer to Earth than any known asteroid, except for those that became meteors. Given an estimated absolute magnitude of 28.7,  is estimated to be around 5 to 10 metres in diameter. Had it impacted Earth, it would mostly have disintegrated during atmospheric entry and might have left a common strewn field.

Discovery 
 was discovered on 14 November 2020, by the Asteroid Terrestrial-impact Last Alert System (ATLAS) survey at the Mauna Loa Observatory in Hawaii. The asteroid was discovered fifteen hours after its closest approach to Earth, moving about 0.28 degrees per hour across the constellation Fornax at an apparent magnitude of 17.3.

The discovery was subsequently reported to the Minor Planet Center's Near-Earth Object Confirmation Page (NEOCP) under the internal designation A10sHcN. Further refinements to the asteroid's preliminary trajectory were made with additional follow-up observations by the Galhassin Robotic Telescope, iTelescope Observatory, and the Glenlee Observatory. The asteroid was also identified in earlier observations by the Zwicky Transient Facility one hour before its discovery by ATLAS-MLO. The asteroid was then confirmed by the Minor Planet Center and announced with the provisional designation  on 14 November 2020.

Orbit and classification 

Before the Earth encounter on 13 November 2020,  had an Apollo-type orbit crossing the paths of Earth and Mars. The orbit had an orbital eccentricity of 0.246 and an inclination of 12.9 degrees to the ecliptic. The Jet Propulsion Laboratory's Small-Body Database still provides an Apollo-type osculating orbit for  based on the epoch 31 May 2020 (JD 2459000.5) before the Earth encounter; excluding all gravitational perturbations, the given orbit implies the asteroid would have passed perihelion 19 hours after it passed Earth.

2020 flyby 
On 13 November 2020, 15 hours prior to its discovery,  passed  over the South Pacific Ocean at 17:20 UTC. At this time of closest approach, 's on-sky position was close to the Sun with a minimum solar elongation of 36 degrees, making it unobservable to Earth-based telescopes.  passed closer to Earth than any known asteroid, except for those that became meteors.

See also 
 List of asteroid close approaches to Earth in 2020
 Asteroid impact prediction

Notes

References

External links 
 "Pseudo-MPEC" for A10sHcN , Project Pluto, 14 November 2020
 
 
 

Discoveries by ATLAS
Minor planet object articles (unnumbered)
20201113
20201114